The Elands River is a river in the former Transvaal area, South Africa. It is a tributary of the Olifants River, part of the Limpopo River basin.

Course
The Elands River originates west of Bronkhorstspruit, Gauteng Province, flowing northwards and then bending northeastwards into the Rust de Winter Dam, where the Rust De Winter Nature Reserve is located. A few kilometers downstream it flows into the larger Rhenosterkop Dam. Finally it joins the Olifants River at the head of the Arabie Dam reservoir.

Dams in the river 
 Rust de Winter Dam
 Rhenosterkop Dam

Gallery

References

External links

Rust De Winter Nature Reserve, South Africa
The Olifants River Basin, South Africa
Channel Slopes in the Olifants, Crocodile and Sabie River Catchments

Olifants River (Limpopo)
Rivers of Gauteng
Rivers of Mpumalanga
Rivers of Limpopo